The Seed is the 2021 body horror feature film directorial debut of Sam Walker, who also wrote the script. The movie premiered in the United States at Beyond Fest, after which it was released to Shudder as one of its original films.

Synopsis
Three friends, Deidre, Charlotte, and Heather, have travelled to the Mojave Desert in order to livestream a meteor shower while staying at a palatial home owned by Heather's father. Deidre is frustrated when their phones stop working, as she had hoped to use the event to further increase her standing as a social media influencer. A meteor crash lands on the property, and the women retrieve it, only to discover that it's a strange creature. The following day, the creature appears to molt, shedding its rocky exterior. Unnerved by the creature, the women try to have their young gardener, Brett, get rid of it, but he fails to do so and flees the property as the creature is still alive. The women argue over whether they should kill the creature, eventually agreeing against doing so for the time being.

That night, the creature cries so loudly that Charlotte brings it inside, much to Heather's anger. The women again argue until they decide that Charlotte and Heather should go into town and find someone to take it away. While they're gone, the creature hypnotizes Deidre. Charlotte and Heather go to their neighbor Edna's home, in hope of finding help. They instead find her home uninhabited while also discovering disturbing notebooks about the meteor shower. They return home, where they find Deidre acting strangely. That night, the creature turns into a blob and absorbs both Deidre and Heather after similarly hypnotizing her.

The following morning, Charlotte becomes frightened by her friends' different personalities and the increasingly menacing activities of the creature. Charlotte returns to Edna's home in hopes of finding a car and fleeing the home but is unsuccessful. She re-examines the journals, revealing that Edna had also had an experience with a similar creature. Panicked, Charlotte goes outside and discovers that Edna had killed herself. She returns home where the creature tries and fails to hypnotize her. Deidre and Heather's bodies begin to change as their stomachs swell, after which they begin to vomit a strange black fluid. Charlotte manages to kill the creature with some difficulty, but her friends remain changed. She then chases her friends outside and manages to kill Heather. Just as she is about to do the same to Deidre, a cowboy arrives and stops Charlotte by shooting her. He is killed by Deidre, who in turn is finished off by Charlotte. Just as she is about to flee, the meteor shower begins as Charlotte looks on in horror.

Cast
 Lucy Martin as Deidre
 Chelsea Edge as Charlotte
 Sophie Vavasseur as Heather
 Jamie Wittebrood as Brett
 Anthony Edridge as Cowboy
 Shirley Pisani as Edna

Production
Prior to directing The Seed, Walker had only directed short films, making the movie his feature film directorial debut. He has cited Nicolas Roeg's The Man Who Fell to Earth, John Carpenter's The Thing, and Eraserhead, as inspirations for the movie, as well as the art of painter Ambera Wellmann. Walker designed the creature so that it would look like it could have come from the planet Earth, "so the girls didn't look stupid for [not] clocking an alien right away", and chose the design after googling pictures of animals that had washed up on beaches.

Walker used social media as an element for the film, likening it to how the creature was "kind of weak, blind, and strange, and have this something else inside it". He stated that social media "looks like it's one thing and you look at it -- yeah, that's cool, but you're doing something completely fucking different" and that "To me, The Seed represents how on social media, someone can watch one video that will then lead to something that begins to radicalize them."

Filming took place in Malta during 2020. Deadline noted that The Seed was a "rare example of a project to have been fully packaged and financed during lockdown." Lucy Martin was brought on to portray influencer Deidre, a character she described as high energy and different from herself.

Release
The film had its world premiere on 5 October 2021 at Beyond Fest in the United States and went on to screen at FrightFest London. The following year The Seed was released to horror streaming platform Shudder as a Shudder Original on 10 March.

Reception

Common criticism focused on the film's pacing and atmosphere, while praise centered upon the special effects and creature design. Abby Olcese of RogerEbert.com panned the movie, writing that "A stronger balance of theme and scares would make “The Seed” something remarkable. Instead, it’s more like a top-notch effects reel with a lengthy prologue." Horror outlet Rue Morgue was more favorable, praising the film's themes and stating that "Walkers’ feature film debut has proven that he has an eye and mind to create a twisted blend of comedy and horror with the latter providing better results." Kim Newman also reviewed The Seed, opining "Some elements are wildly inventive, but it defaults to overfamiliar stuff (black oil leaking from eyes) and I kind of miss the era of Inseminoid and XTRO where British alien impregnation movies didn’t completely pretend to be American."

References

External links
 

2021 films
2021 horror films
British body horror films
Shudder (streaming service) original programming
2021 directorial debut films
Fiction about parasites
Alien visitations in films
British science fiction horror films
Films about social media
2020s English-language films
2020s British films